Events from the year 1818 in Canada.

Incumbents
Monarch: George III

Federal government
Parliament of Lower Canada: 9th 
Parliament of Upper Canada: 7th

Governors
Governor of the Canadas: Robert Milnes
Governor of New Brunswick: George Stracey Smyth
Governor of Nova Scotia: John Coape Sherbrooke
Commodore-Governor of Newfoundland: Richard Goodwin Keats
Governor of Prince Edward Island: Charles Douglass Smith

Events
 April 1 – An expedition sails for the North Pole.
 August 28 – The Governor (Charles Lennox, 4th Duke of Richmond) dies of rabies.

Full date unknown
 Halifax and St. John's are made free ports.
 49th parallel becomes British North America/U.S. border from Lake of the Woods to the Rocky Mountains
 Dalhousie University is established.

Births
January 17 – Antoine-Aimé Dorion, politician and jurist (d. 1891)
March 10 – John Ross, lawyer, politician, and businessman. Born in County Antrim, Ireland (d. 1871)
March 19 – Élisabeth Bruyère, nun (d. 1876)
March 25 – Edwin Randolph Oakes, politician (d.1889)
May 8 – Samuel Leonard Tilley, Premier of New Brunswick (d. 1896)
September – Hugh Cossart Baker, Sr., banker, businessman and mathematician (d.1859)
September 4 – Louis-François Richer Laflèche, diocese of Trois-Rivières (d.1898)
October 1 – David Christie, politician (d.1880)
November 29 – George Brown, journalist, politician and one of the Fathers of the Confederation (d.1880)

Full date unknown
Alexander Francis Macdonald, politician (d.1913)

Deaths

References 

 
Canada
Years of the 19th century in Canada
1818 in North America